The Chur Rhine Valley (also commonly known as the Bündner Rheintal) is that part of Nordbünden through which the Rhine flows from the confluence of Anterior and Posterior Rhine near Reichenau to the cantonal border near Maienfeld and Fläsch. The plain of Bonaduz and Rhäzüns also belongs to the Chur Rhine Valley and forms its southern end. The valley is part of the Alpine Rhine natural landscape.

Geographical division 
The Chur Rhine Valley is divided into three sub-regions:

 the section from Reichenau to Chur, whose landscape is characterised by the tumas

 the area of the Five Villages

 the Bündner Herrschaft

Climate 
Climatically, the Chur Rhine Valley is one of the warmest and driest regions in the Canton of Grisons. It experiences föhn winds on a large number of days during the year.

Language and population 
Most of the population speak Bündner German (in Chur the variant of Chur German). In  Rhäzüns and especially in Domat/Ems they also speak Romansh.

In recent years, the settlements of the Chur Rhine Valley have increasingly grown together into an urban region around the central town of Chur.

Media 
Regional daily newspapers in the area are the Bündner Tagblatt and Südostschweiz. In the Bündner Herrschaft, the local papers are the Prättigauer und Herrschäftler and in the southern part of the Bündner Rhine Valley, the Ruinaulta (called the Rhiiblatt until late 2013).
The periodicals, Terra Grischuna and Rheinfluss, deal with the Chur Rhine Valley in terms of cultural and natural history.

Panorama 

}

Valleys of Graubünden